Frogger's Adventures: The Rescue is an action-adventure video game released in 2003 by Hudson Soft. It is based on the original 1981 Frogger arcade game, and contains similar hop-and-dodge style gameplay.

Story
A young Frog named Frogger is relaxing inside his home in Firefly Swamp when a spaceship crashes in his yard, injuring his friend and guardian Lumpy. The driver of the ship turns out to be Beauty Frog of F.I.R.S.T. (Frog International Rescue Support Team). Frogger becomes a member of F.I.R.S.T. and goes on missions to exotic locations to rescue many of Beauty Frog's friends, including Doctor Frog, who is needed to heal Lumpy. Finally he rescues his girlfriend Lily, who has been kidnapped by T.R.I.P (Tyrannical Reptiles in Power).

Gameplay
The game contains hop-and-dodge style gameplay similar to that of the original arcade game. Frogger, however, can perform many moves that he could not in the original. Frogger can perform a "super hop" which allows him to jump over the space in front of him, as well as being able to move footholds and sections of certain walls with his tongue. Frogger can also rotate left and right.

Story mode
Story mode is the main mode of play, and is for one player only. The player takes control of Frogger and helps him explore challenging levels.

Multiplayer mode
Multiplayer mode contains nine mini-games that can be played with up to four players. Initially, only one game is available, but a new one becomes unlocked when Frogger completes the training level, and each time he completes all the levels in a world. In multiplayer mode players are allowed to play as Frogger, Lumpy, and Beauty Frog, along with other F.I.R.S.T. agents Ranger Frog and Ninja Frog.

Reception

The game received mixed reviews. GameSpot gave it a 6.3 out of 10 saying that although it doesn't try anything new, it's still a solid game. IGN gave it a 5.5 out of 10 saying it wasn't bad but it wasn't good either. They criticized the lack of challenge when it came to puzzles and the poor controls. The game sold around half a million copies across its three platforms. Play magazine gave the game a positive rating noting the levels as being clever,  the boss fights being creative and stating “a substantially entertaining game that maintains the classic sensibilities of the original, building upon them, expanding the concept, evolving it into an inspired yet uncomplicated action-puzzler.”

References

External links

2003 video games
Action-adventure games
Frogger
GameCube games
Hudson Soft games
Konami games
Multiplayer and single-player video games
PlayStation 2 games
RenderWare games
Video games developed in Japan
Windows games